John Stewart Porter is a Scottish former footballer.

Playing career

Youth football
Porter played youth football for Hutchinson Vale and Salvesen Boys Club.

Scotland
After spending two years on the books at Hearts he moved to Forfar Athletic. While at Forfar Porter played 27 times scoring six goals. He then transferred to Berwick Rangers where he played 21 games. In 1984, he moved to East Fife where he spent two years.

Australia
In 1986 Porter emigrated to Australia where he played two seasons with National Soccer League team St. George. After leaving St. George Porter played for a number of NSW Premier League clubs.

Coaching career
Porter began coaching with Sutherland in the NSW Premier League in 1998 while still playing. In 2000, he moved on to Sydney University where he coached until 2004. In 2005, he again took the helm at Sutherland until moving to Sydney Wanderers in 2007.

References

1961 births
Living people
Footballers from Edinburgh
Association football forwards
Scottish footballers
Heart of Midlothian F.C. players
Forfar Athletic F.C. players
East Fife F.C. players
Berwick Rangers F.C. players
Bonnyrigg Rose Athletic F.C. players
Scottish Football League players
Scottish Junior Football Association players
National Soccer League (Australia) players
Scottish expatriate footballers
Expatriate soccer players in Australia